The 61st edition of the event Miss Guatemala for 2015, was held on September 20, 2015 in Hall Azarea, Paseo Cayalá in Guatemala City, Guatemala. 12 candidates Departments competed for the title. At the end of the event Ana Luisa Montufar, Miss Guatemala 2014, crowned Jeimmy Aburto of Capital City South as his successor.

The final evening was broadcast live and live by National channel Guatemala. The final gala was led by Carina Velasquez and Cristian Zamora. The artists who enlivened the evening were the Guatemalan singer Danny Sanjosé and Mexican singer Alejandro Peniche.

Winner and runners-up

Miss Guatemala
Historical events in Guatemala
2015 in Guatemala